Kanasi (or Sona) is the easternmost Papuan language of New Guinea.

Phonology

Vowels

Consonants

References

External links 
 Alphabet and pronunciation
 Kanasi Organized Phonology Data

Languages of Milne Bay Province
Dagan languages